Wawer  is one of the districts of Warsaw, located in the south-eastern part of the city. The Vistula river runs along its western border.  Wawer became a district of Warsaw on 27 October 2002 (previously it was a part of Praga Południe district, and a municipality earlier).

Wawer borders Praga Południe and Rembertów from the north, Wesoła from the east and Wilanów with Mokotów from the west (across the Vistula).

Boroughs 
Aleksandrów
Anin 
Falenica 
Las
Marysin Wawerski
Miedzeszyn 
Międzylesie 
Nadwiśle 
Radość 
Sadul 
Wawer 
Zerzeń.

History 
The name Wawer comes from the name of the Wawer inn (Karczma Wawer, currently known as Zajazd Napoleoński). The oldest mention of the tavern comes from 1727, and the Wawer colony was established in 1838. First settlers appeared in 1839. During the November Uprising, the first and second Wawer battles took place here in early 1831.

On the night of 26/27 December 1939 German occupants committed the Wawer massacre.

In 1951, Wawer was incorporated into Warsaw.

In 1960, Wawer was incorporated into the Praga Południe district. In 1994 Wawer reappeared on the map of Warsaw as a commune (Warsaw - Wawer). In 2002, the Wawer commune was transformed into a district.

References

External links 

 Urząd Dzielnicy Wawer
 Lokalny Serwis Informacyjny - Wawer
 Serwis "Moja dzielnica" Wawer
Świdermajer - The characteristic architecture in the area